Richard M. Abel is a New Hampshire politician.

Early life
Abel attended Miami University.

Career
Abel has served as an associate professor at Franklin Pierce University and as executive director of the University Press of New England. On November 4, 2014, Abel was elected to the New Hampshire House of Representatives where he represents the Grafton 13 district. He assumed office on December 3, 2014 a Democrat.

Personal life
Abel resides in West Lebanon, New Hampshire. Abel is married has two children.

References

Living people
Franklin Pierce University faculty
Democratic Party members of the New Hampshire House of Representatives
Miami University alumni
People from Lebanon, New Hampshire
21st-century American politicians
Year of birth missing (living people)